Flying W Airport  is a public-use airport located one nautical mile (1.852 km) southwest of the central business district of Lumberton Township in Burlington County, New Jersey, United States. The airport is privately owned. The address is 60 Fostertown Road, Medford, NJ 08055.

Facilities and aircraft
The property was bought in 1961 by local pilot William Whitesell. He converted the former farmland to its current use in 1964, naming it the "Flying 'W'" for his last name. After he declared bankruptcy in 1972, the airport closed until 1984, when it reopened.

It has one runway designated 01/19 with an asphalt surface measuring 3,496 by 75 feet (1066 x 22 m).

For the 12-month period ending February 19, 2009, the airport had 74,222 aircraft operations, an average of 203 per day: 100% general aviation. At that time there were 119 aircraft based at this airport: 85% single-engine, 8% helicopters and 7% multi-engine.

In 2016, the portion of the airport within Medford Township was proposed to be converted to a 450-unit housing complex by 2025. The deal would not affect the restaurant and motel complex within Lumberton Township.

The 28-room motel closed in October 2019. The café and bar closed indefinitely in March 2020 as a result of the COVID-19 pandemic.

Incidents and accidents
September 8, 2017: Country music musician and vocalist Troy Gentry was killed in the 2017 Medford, New Jersey Schweizer 269C crash. The accident was primarily attributed to the pilot's "failure to maintain rotor rpm... which resulted in an uncontrolled descent."

References

External links

Official website

Airports in New Jersey
Transportation buildings and structures in Burlington County, New Jersey
Medford, New Jersey